Daniel Gene Walters (August 15, 1966 – April 23, 2020) was an American professional baseball player. He played as a catcher in Major League Baseball (MLB) for the San Diego Padres in the 1992 and 1993 seasons.

Career
Born in Brunswick, Maine, Walters attended Santana High School in Santee, California. In 84 career games, he had 64 hits in 273 at-bats, with a .234 batting average. 

After his playing days were over, Walters remained in San Diego and became a police officer with the San Diego Police Department. He became paralyzed from the neck down after he was shot in the neck and hit by a car in 2003. Later he regained some movement in his left hand. 

Walters died due to complications from his injuries on April 23, 2020. He was 53.

References

External links

1966 births
2020 deaths
American expatriate baseball players in Canada
American police officers
American shooting survivors
Asheville Tourists players
Auburn Astros players
Baseball players from Maine
Colorado Springs Sky Sox players
Columbus Astros players
Deaths by firearm in California
Edmonton Trappers players
Las Vegas Stars (baseball) players
Major League Baseball catchers
Osceola Astros players
People from Brunswick, Maine
People murdered in California
People with tetraplegia
San Diego Padres players
Baseball players from San Diego
Tucson Toros players
Wichita Wranglers players
People with paraplegia